Christian Duke (born June 5, 1991) is an American soccer player.

Career

College
Duke spent his entire college career at the University of San Diego.  After making only two appearances in 2009, Duke made 17 appearances in his sophomore year in 2010 and tallied two assists on his way to being named All-WCC honorable mention.  In 2011, he made 18 appearances and tallied four assists.  In his senior year in 2012, Duke made 23 appearances and was named All-West Coast Conference Second Team despite finishing the year without a goal or an assist.

Professional
On January 22, 2013, Duke was drafted 14th overall in the 2013 MLS Supplemental Draft by Sporting Kansas City.  A month later, Duke signed his first professional contract with the club.

Shortly after signing with Kansas City, Duke was loaned out to USL Pro affiliate club Orlando City for the 2013 season along with teammates Dom Dwyer, Jon Kempin and Yann Songo'o. On March 17, 2014 he was assigned on loan to Oklahoma City Energy FC, before being recalled to the Sporting roster on June 4, 2014.

After two seasons with Orange County SC, Duke returned to Kansas City on January 6, 2020, when he joined the now renamed Sporting Kansas City II.

Following the 2021 season, Kansas City opted to decline their contract option on Duke.

On February 23, 2022, Duke signed a one-year contract with the Kansas City Comets of the Major Arena Soccer League.

Coaching
Duke continues to coach in the greater Kansas City area with the private coaching service, CoachUp.

References

External links

San Diego Toreros bio

1991 births
Living people
American soccer players
San Diego Toreros men's soccer players
Sporting Kansas City players
Orlando City SC (2010–2014) players
OKC Energy FC players
Sporting Kansas City II players
Orange County SC players
Association football midfielders
Soccer players from Kansas
Sportspeople from Overland Park, Kansas
Sporting Kansas City draft picks
USL Championship players
Homegrown Players (MLS)